Severn Valley could be

The Severn Valley (England) in Shropshire, English Midlands (UK)
The Severn Valley Country Park in Shropshire, English Midlands (UK)
The fictional Severn Valley (Cthulhu Mythos)